Anneli Haaranen (18 February 1934 – 12 December 2020) was a Finnish freestyle and backstroke swimmer. She competed in two events at the 1952 Summer Olympics.

References

External links
 

1934 births
2020 deaths
Finnish female backstroke swimmers
Finnish female freestyle swimmers
Olympic swimmers of Finland
Swimmers at the 1952 Summer Olympics
Swimmers from Helsinki